V2.fi is a Finnish entertainment and gaming oriented website that publishes daily articles, reviews, and news about movies, video games, music, and entertainment devices. It also has a comprehensive forum and a section for fun videos. Almost all of the content published on the site is open for user supplied comments. The site was published by Alasin Media in August 2007.

Statistics 
According to public TNS Metrix site measurements there are about 45 000—53 000 weekly visitors on the site.

References

External links 
 V2.fi

Internet properties established in 2007
Video game news websites